Darren Spencer Simkin (born 24 March 1970) is an English former footballer who played as a defender. He played in the Football League for both Wolverhampton Wanderers and Shrewsbury Town.

Career
Simkin joined Second Division club Wolverhampton Wanderers in November 1992 for £10,000 from non-league Blakenhall Town. He made his senior debut on 7 April 1993 in a 1–1 draw against Luton Town, the first of seven consecutive first team appearances.

He made only sixteen appearances in total for Wolves before he was sold to Shrewsbury Town in December 1994 for £36,000. He remained with Shrewsbury for eighteen months before he dropped back into non-league by joining Telford United, whom he had also spent a loan spell with.

The defender spent the remaining years of his football career in West Midlands non-league football, before ending his pro career in 2004 shortly after winning the FA Trophy with Hednesford Town.

Since leaving football Simkin has entered Walsall fire service.

Simkin is married with two children..

References

1970 births
Living people
Sportspeople from Walsall
English footballers
Wolverhampton Wanderers F.C. players
Shrewsbury Town F.C. players
Telford United F.C. players
Stafford Rangers F.C. players
Hednesford Town F.C. players
English Football League players
Association football defenders